Legion is a turn-based computer wargame with a historical setting, designed by Slitherine and released in 2002. In Legion, the player attempts to build a powerful army by controlling villages and defeating enemies with the ultimate goal of dominating a region. An updated version, Legion Gold, was released in 2003. A port for OS X was released in 2003, developed by Freeverse. A sequel, Legion II, was announced on November 16, 2004 for a 2005 release.

Gameplay
Legion is a turn-based single-player wargame. The strategy of battle involves fighting on favorable terrain with enemies weak against the player's units. Other concerns are capturing cities that produce food, stone and wood. Upgrading the cities' buildings leads to the production of stronger units.

Each unit in Legion has its own strengths and weaknesses, different types of attacks (melee and ranged) and weapon.

Legion takes place in the historic setting of the Roman expansion, from the conquest of Italy, Britain, Hispania, Gaul and Germania.

Campaigns 
Legion Gold comes with eight campaign maps (including tutorial), each of which has three difficulty levels and options for historical and non-historical gameplay settings. The maps are generally well-researched and correspond closely to historical geography in the names of tribes and locations of cities.

Development
Legion was announced on July 30, 2001. The development release of Legion Gold was in 2002. An iPad version was released on December 31, 2012.

Reception

Legion Gold got a 6.9 on Gamezone, an 8 on Gamevortex and a 7.5 on the Entertainment Depot, amongst others.

See also
Legion Arena

References

External links

2002 video games
Computer wargames
Freeverse Inc. games
IOS games
MacOS games
Paradox Interactive games
Single-player video games
Slitherine Software games
Strategy First games
Turn-based strategy video games
Video games developed in the United Kingdom
Video games set in the Roman Empire
Windows games